The women's 4 × 200 metre freestyle relay event at the 2002 Commonwealth Games as part of the swimming programme took place on 1 August at the Manchester Aquatics Centre in Manchester, England.

Records
Prior to this competition, the existing world and games records were as follows.

The following records were established during the competition:

Results
The final was held at 20:32.

References

 

Women's 4 x 200 metre freestyle relay
Commonwealth Games
Common